Thornwood Common is a village on the B1393 road, in the civil parish of North Weald Bassett and the Epping Forest district of Essex, England. In 2018 it had an estimated population of 1016.

The hamlet of Thornwood is conjoined to the village at the north. Thornwood Common Flood Meadow is a Local Nature Reserve.

References 

 A-Z Essex (page 65)

External links

Villages in Essex
North Weald Bassett